"Walking to Jerusalem" is a song written by Sam Hogin and Mark D. Sanders, and recorded by American country music artist Tracy Byrd. It was released on July 25, 1995 as the lead single from the album Love Lessons.    The song reached number 15 on the U.S. Billboard Hot Country Singles & Tracks chart and peaked at number 11 in Canada.

Music video
The music video was directed by Gerry Wenner and was filmed in Saint Hedwig, Texas.

Chart performance
"Walking to Jerusalem" debuted at number 68 on the U.S. Billboard Hot Country Single & Tracks for the week of June 3, 1995.

Year-end charts

References

1995 singles
1995 songs
Tracy Byrd songs
Songs written by Mark D. Sanders
Song recordings produced by Tony Brown (record producer)
MCA Records singles
Songs written by Sam Hogin